Michael Joseph "Mike" Kopetski (born October 27, 1949, in Pendleton, Oregon) is an American lawyer, businessman, and former politician who served two terms as a member of the United States House of Representatives from 1991 to 1995.

Early life and education 
He earned his Bachelor of Arts from American University and Juris Doctor from Lewis & Clark Law School.

Congress 
He ran unsuccessfully for the United States House of Representatives in 1982, losing in the Democratic primary for Oregon's newly created 5th district. He ran again in 1988, this time winning the nomination. In the general election, he lost by a mere 707 votes to incumbent Denny Smith. In 1990, Kopetski ran against Smith again and defeated him, in part by tying Smith to the savings and loan crisis.

Kopetski served the 5th district from 1991 to 1995 and sat on the Ways and Means Committee. He did not seek reelection in 1994.

Later career 
After leaving Congress, Kopetski became an international trade consultant and currently serves on the board of On2 Technologies, in which he held a ten percent ownership interest until disposing of 50,000 of his 69,200 shares in September 2006.

He is a former Director General of the Center for International Forestry Research (CIFOR) in Indonesia.

He and his wife have lived in many countries.

References

External links 

 
Michael J. Kopetski papers, 1976-1995
Ex-lawmaker: U.S. should end hostility against Cuba (January 15, 2020)

1949 births
Living people
Democratic Party members of the Oregon House of Representatives
Politicians from Pendleton, Oregon
Democratic Party members of the United States House of Representatives from Oregon

Members of Congress who became lobbyists